HMS Denbigh Castle (K696) was one of 44 s built for the Royal Navy during World War II. The ship was completed at the end of 1944 and was assigned to the 7th Escort Group at the beginning of 1945. While escorting her first and only Arctic convoy to Russia, she claimed to have shot down a German torpedo bomber. The ship was beached in an effort to save her, but she was pulled off by the ebbing tide and capsized. Her wreck was declared a total loss.

Design and description
The Castle-class corvette was a stretched version of the preceding , enlarged to improve seakeeping and to accommodate modern weapons. They were powered by a pair of triple-expansion steam engines, each driving one propeller shaft using steam provided by two Admiralty three-drum boilers. The ships' complement was 99 officers and ratings.

The Castle-class ships were equipped with a single QF  Mk XVI gun forward, but their primary weapon was their single three-barrel Squid anti-submarine mortar. This was backed up by one depth charge rail and two throwers for 15 depth charges. The ships were fitted with two twin and a pair of single mounts for  Oerlikon light AA guns. Provision was made for a further four single mounts if needed. They were equipped with Type 145Q and Type 147B ASDIC sets to detect submarines by reflections from sound waves beamed into the water. A Type 277 search radar and a HF/DF radio direction finder rounded out the Castles' sensor suite.

Construction and career
Denbigh Castle, the only ship of her name to serve in the Royal Navy, was ordered on 19 December 1942 and laid down by John Lewis & Sons at their shipyard in Aberdeen, Scotland, on 30 September 1943. The ship was launched on 5 August 1944 and completed on 30 December 1944. She arrived at Tobermory, Mull, Scotland, on 12 January 1945 to begin training at the Royal Navy's Anti-Submarine Training School, . Having completed training, Denbigh Castle arrived at Scapa Flow on 29 January to join the 7th Escort Group.

Commanded by Lieutenant Commander Graham Butcher, the ship escorted Convoy JW 64 to Murmansk at the beginning of February. On the 7th, Denbigh Castle claimed to have shot down a German torpedo bomber. The torpedo struck the bow and the crew thought that the ship had struck a mine. The explosion killed eleven ratings and threw the four-inch gun onto the Squid platform behind it. The remaining bow structure sagged downwards, although Denbigh Castle was in no danger of sinking. The destroyer  transferred her medical officer over and the corvette  came alongside around 00:45 to receive casualties, and Butcher ordered as many ratings aboard her as he thought he could spare.

The  came alongside at 04:30 to transfer a  salvage pump as the corvette was still taking on water. At 05:01, Butcher ordered all remaining hands aboard the Soviet ship because Denbigh Castle was slowly sinking by the bow, only the officers remaining aboard. Buresvestniks captain, not wanting the corvette to founder in the channel, took over the tow at 06:15, by which time her stern was nearly out of the water. Denbigh Castle was beached at 07:30 at Bolshaya Volokovaya Bay near Vaenga; Buresvestnik then pushed her stern around. The ship began to slowly list with the ebbing tide and the officers abandoned her at 09:05; five minutes later she capsized and slid into deeper water. The intense cold made later efforts to retrieve or destroy secret documents and equipment still aboard extremely difficult, but the diving team from the light cruiser  did manage to demolish the radar office. In recognition of her service, Denbigh Castle was awarded the battle honour Arctic 1945.

References

Bibliography

External links
HMS Denbigh Castle on uboat.net
Castle Class Corvettes on www.worldnavalships.com
HMS Denbigh Castle on www.wrecksite.eu
Steel Corvettes 

 

Castle-class corvettes
1944 ships
Shipwrecks in the Barents Sea
Ships sunk by German submarines in World War II
World War II shipwrecks in the Arctic Ocean
Maritime incidents in February 1945
Ships built in Aberdeen